Hilton or Hylton may refer to:

Companies
 Hilton Worldwide Holdings, Inc., a global hospitality company based in the United States that owns several hotel chains and subsidiary companies containing the Hilton name
 Hilton Hotels & Resorts, flagship hotel brand operated under Hilton Worldwide Holdings, Inc.
 Conrad N. Hilton Foundation, an American non-profit charitable foundation, established in 1944 by hotel entrepreneur Conrad N. Hilton
 Ladbrokes, a British-based gambling company, known as Hilton Group plc from May 1999 to February 2006

Places

Australia
 Hilton, Chatswood, a heritage-listed house in the Sydney suburb of Chatswood
 Hilton, South Australia, a suburb of Adelaide
 Hilton, Western Australia, a suburb of Perth

Canada
 Hilton, Ontario, a township 
 Hilton Beach, a small village surrounded by the township in Ontario
 Hilton Falls Conservation Area, located in Campbellville, Ontario

Norway
 Hilton, a farm near Kløfta, Ullensaker, known as the birthplace of Augustus Hilton, father of American hotelier Conrad Hilton

South Africa
 Hilton, KwaZulu-Natal, a town next to Pietermaritzburg
 Hilton, Bloemfontein, a suburb of Bloemfontein

United Kingdom

England
 Hilton Park (stadium), a multi-use stadium in Leigh, Greater Manchester
 Hilton Hall, an 18th-century mansion house now in use as an office and business centre at Hilton, near Wolverhampton, Staffordshire
 Hilton Park services, a motorway service station, between junctions 10a and 11 of the M6 motorway in Staffordshire
 Hilton, Cambridgeshire, a village
 Hilton, Cumbria, a village
 Hilton, Derbyshire, a village
 Hilton, Dorset, a village
 Hilton, County Durham, a village
 Hilton, North Yorkshire, a village
 Hilton, Shropshire, a village
 Hilton, Lichfield District, a village in Staffordshire
 Hilton, South Staffordshire, a civil parish in Staffordshire
 Hylton Castle in Hylton district of Sunderland
 Cauld Lad of Hylton, the ghost of a murdered stable boy that haunts the ruins of Hylton Castle
 North Hylton, a suburb of Sunderland, in northeast England
 South Hylton Metro station, serves the village of South Hylton on the banks of the River
 South Hylton in Sunderland

Scotland
 Hilton, Aberdeen, a former village, now a neighbourhood
 Hilton of Cadboll, a village
 Hilton of Cadboll Stone, a Class II Pictish stone discovered at Hilton of Cadboll
 Hilton, Berwickshire, a village
 Hilton, Inverness, a former village, now part of the city

United States
Hilton, Georgia, an unincorporated community
 Hilton, Kentucky
 Hilton, Maryland, an unincorporated community
 Hilton, New Jersey
 Hilton, New York, a village
 Hilton, Oklahoma, an unincorporated community
 Hiltons, Virginia, an unincorporated community in Scott County, Virginia
 Hilton Coliseum, a 14,057-seat multi-purpose arena in Ames, Iowa
 Hilton Head Island, South Carolina, a town, located on an island of the same name
 Hilton Head Airport, a county-owned, public-use airport located in northeastern Hilton Head Island
 Lyric Theatre (New York City, 1998), formerly named the Hilton Theatre, a Broadway theatre located at 213 West 42nd Street in New York City
 Hilton Village, a planned, English-village-style neighborhood in Newport News, Virginia
 Hilton Pier/Ravine, a park located in the village
 Savannah/Hilton Head International Airport, located 7 miles (11 km) northwest of Savannah, Georgia
 Willis, Floyd County, Virginia, also known as Hylton, an unincorporated community in Floyd County, Virginia
 Hilton (Columbus, Georgia), 
 Hilton (Catonsville, Maryland)

Vietnam
 Hanoi Hilton, a former prison in Hanoi

Schools
 Hilton College of Hotel and Restaurant Management, University of Houston, Houston, Texas, United States
 Hilton College (South Africa), Hilton, KwaZulu-Natal, South Africa
 Hilton High School in Hilton, New York, United States
 C. D. Hylton High School in Woodbridge, Virginia, United States
 Hilton Head Preparatory School, Hilton Head Island, South Carolina, United States
 Hilton Central School District, New York State, United States
 Hilton Head Christian Academy, Hilton Head Island, South Carolina, United States
 Hilton Elementary School (Newport News, Virginia), Newport News, Virginia, United States
 Hilton D. Bell Intermediate School, Garden Grove, California, United States
 Hilton Leech House and Amagansett Art School, Sarasota, Florida, United States
 Red House Academy, formerly Hylton Red House School, Sunderland, Tyne and Wear, England

People 
 Conrad Hilton, founder of the Hilton Hotels Group
Hilton family, the extended family of Conrad Hilton
 Hilton (surname)
 Hilton (given name)

Other uses
 Bangkok Hilton (1989), an Australian television miniseries
 Chip Hilton Player of the Year Award, presented to a basketball player who has demonstrated personal character both on and off the court
 Conrad N. Hilton Humanitarian Prize, the largest humanitarian award in the world
 Eckmann–Hilton argument, an argument in mathematics about two monoid structures on a set where one is a homomorphism for the other
 The Hanoi Hilton (film) (1987), a Vietnam War film which focuses on the experiences of American prisoners of war who were held in the Hanoi Hilton
 Hilton Flight, a horse ridden in international show jumping by Richard Spooner
 Hilton International Stakes, a Group 2 Australian thoroughbred horse race
 Hilton Quota, the quota applied to beef imported from certain countries into the European Union
 Hilton v. Guyot (1895), a U.S. Supreme Court case in which the court described the factors to be used when considering the application of comity
 Hilton's law, an observation on topological anatomy
 Hilton's white line, a boundary in the anal canal
 Hylton v. United States (1796), a U.S. Supreme Court case involving judicial review
 I Want To Be a Hilton (2005), a weekly NBC reality television series that was hosted by Kathy Hilton
 London Hilton bombing, a 1975 explosion at the Hilton Hotel in London, England
 Sydney Hilton Hotel bombing, a 1978 explosion outside the Hilton Hotel in Sydney, Australia
 "The Milton Hilton", the local nickname of the Otago Corrections Facility prison in Milton, New Zealand

See also

Hilton Hotel (disambiguation)
Hilton House (disambiguation)
 Hiltonia, Georgia